Radio FG (since February 2013, formerly FG DJ Radio, acronym for Feel Good) is a French-language radio station that began broadcasting from Paris on 98.2 MHz in the FM band in 1981. It is France's first radio station that broadcasts deep house and electro house music (originally electronic and underground music). The station's current playlist is house, dance, R&B and electronica alongside several American hip-hop songs broadcast from time to time.

History 
Radio FG was founded in 1981 as a community radio rooted in the Parisian gay scene and in support of the gay community. The 'FG' initials were said to vary in meaning from "Fréquence Gaie" (Cheerful Frequency) to "Futur Génération" (Future Generation) to "Filles et Garçons" (Girls and Boys).

During its initial four years of broadcasting, the station faced financial struggles as well as internal conflicts, but managed to survive. As time went by, the station, facing an identity crisis, distanced itself from its social activism and re-defined itself as a dedicated electronic music station.

In 2001 Radio FG abandoned its community radio status to become a private radio station.

In September 2003 Radio FG became known as FG DJ Radio and broadened its spectrum of music to include R'n'B and Raï music. Mixshows (known as Club FG for most of the time) originally accounted for 30-50 percent of the entire broadcast week. It now only accounts for 10 percent.

Today, the station broadcasts throughout the Parisian suburbs and in other major cities around France. In September 2004 the radio started a free webradio service called Underground FG. The station devotes 24 hours a day a mix of house, techno and dance music (similar to the original Radio FG), alongside older mixes that already aired on Radio FG.

The website now offers 7 different live streams: FG DeepDance, FG Undrgrnd, Club FG, FG Remix, FG House Chic, and FG Dance by Hakimakli; along with a 6-hour-delayed stream of its main station called FG +6H targeted to its North American audience. There's also a version of the regular FG DJ Radio for Belgium now: Radio FG Belgique. Formerly streams are Vintage FG (which was playing classics) and Energy Burnmix FG.

In about February 2017, Radio FG decided to replace non-stop overnight music (Monday – Thursday mornings 2 am – 5 am) by non-stop rebroadcasts of interviews airing on the drivetime show "Happy Hour FG" with Antoine Baduel. The reason for this change is still unknown, but it could be necessary to save money, especially because Mediametrie doesn't look a lot after the midnight-5 am slot. This raises concerns for the station's listeners, especially Radio FG is an electronic music station. However, Radio FG is not the first music station have to do so. NRJ (France's main top 40 station) also (until today) carries a mostly-speech output from 8 pm to 6 am (Guillaume Radio 2.0, MiKL, Le PreMorning), and Fun Radio, another electronic station, plays far less music from 8 pm to midnight every weeknight (Lovin'Fun and Le Night Show).

History of logos

Notable DJs and presenters
Bob Sinclar
Hakimakli
Tara McDonald for I Like This Beat
DJ Paulette
Martin Solveig
Daft Punk
Joachim Garraud
David Vendetta
DJ Abdel
Benny Benassi

Radio services and frequencies

Radio FG

France
Aix en Provence : 93.4 / 100.5 / DAB+
Amiens : 96.3
Bastia : 94.9
Besançon : 92.0
Caen : 98.7
Clermont-Ferrand: 88.8
Compiègne : 98.2
Corte : 88.4
Épernay / Champagne : 90.3
Lyon : DAB+
Marseille : 100.5 / DAB+
Melun / Paris Sud : 94.9
Nice / Cannes : 96.1 / DAB+
Orléans : 103.4
Paris / Île-de-France : 98.2 / DAB+
Perpignan : 100.8
Poitiers : 103
Reims : 94.6
Rennes : 91.2
Strasbourg : 98.1
Others

Monaco
Monaco : 96.1

Europe
Astra 1N

FG Chic
Paris: 6A DAB+
Lounge music and hedonism since 2013.

FG Deep Dance

FG Home Party
Bringing the club to your crib.

FG Nomade
Mediterranean house and lounge music.

FG Nonstop

Starter FG by Hakimakli
The reference for new electro and house.

FG Undrgrnd
The sound of the underground.

FG -Extra
Not your ordinary radio.

Maxximum

Maxximum Clasixx

Radio FG Antwerpen

For Flanders.   It was broadcast in Antwerp on 100.2 MHz between 2009 and 2017, and also on DAB there between 2015 and 2017. Is currently online only. Top 40/house fusion "F**kin Good Music".

Previously known as "Radio FG Vlaanderen".

Previous radio services

Club FG
Club music.

FG Berlin
Operating over the airwaves from 2012. Later known as "FG Europe".

FG Chic
Berlin: 7B DAB+

Radio FG Réunion
For La Réunion. From 2017 to 2019 it operated over five frequencies. Became RDJ.

Radio FG Mayotte
For Mayotte from 2012 to 2019. Became RDJ.

Vintage FG
Classic dance music.

Energy Burnmix FG

FG Radio USA

FG DJ Radio

FG Gay Party

Compilations by Radio FG 
FG DJ Radio 100% TUBES (2011)
DANCEFLOOR FG SUMMER 2009
Dancefloor FG Summer 2008
CLUB FG 2009
Dancefloor FG Winter 2008
DANCEFLOOR FG WINTER 2009
Dancefloor Summer 2007
Dancefloor FG Winter 2007
FG CLUB DANCE 3
FG CLASSICS
FG CLUB DANCE VOL 2
Vintage
Underground FG vol.2
Underground FG vol.1
RnB Chic
FG Club Dance
Dancefloor FG Summer 2006
Dancefloor FG Winter 2006
Dancefloor FG Summer 2005
Dancefloor FG Winter 2005
Dancefloor FG Summer 2004
Dancefloor FG Winter 2004
Dancefloor FG Summer 2003
Dancefloor FG Winter 2003
Dancefloor FG Summer 2002
Dancefloor FG Winter 2002
Dancefloor FG Summer 2001
Club FG-Zemixx-vol.2
Club FG-Zemixx-vol.1
After FG vol.2
After FG vol.1

Others
Rave Action
Collector FG
Club House Radio FG 98.2
FG for ever
After FG
Club FG
Dancefloor FG
Underground FG
Vintage FG
FG Club Dance
FG Classics
 R'n'B Chic
 French Touch FG

References

External links

 
Belgian website
 Radio FG Poland (fan website)

Radio stations in France
Internet radio stations
Radio in Paris
Radio stations established in 1981
1981 establishments in France